Sandra Elaine Troop (born 15 March 1966 in Lincoln) is a British sprint canoer and marathon canoeist who competed in the early 1990s. She was eliminated in the semifinals of the K-4 500 m event at the 1992 Summer Olympics in Barcelona.

References
 Sports-Reference.com profile

1966 births
English female canoeists
Canoeists at the 1992 Summer Olympics
Living people
Olympic canoeists of Great Britain
British female canoeists
Sportspeople from Lincoln, England